Giacomo the Idealist (Italian: Giacomo l'idealista) is a 1943 Italian drama film directed by Alberto Lattuada and starring Massimo Serato, Marina Berti and Andrea Checchi. It represents the directorial debut of Lattuada.

It is based on the novel with the same name by Emilio De Marchi. It was shot at the Fert Studios in Turin with sets designed by the art director Fulvio Jacchia. It belongs to the movies of the calligrafismo style.

Cast 
Massimo Serato as Giacomo Lanzavecchia
Marina Berti as Celestina
Andrea Checchi as Giacinto Magnenzio
Tina Lattanzi as Countess Cristina Magnenzio 
Armando Migliari as Mr. Mangano
Giacinto Molteni as Count Magnenzio
Giulio Tempesti as  Don Lorenzo 
Attilio Dottesio as Battistella Lanzavecchia
 Domenico Viglione Borghese as Il padre di Giacomo 
 Silvia Leandri as Lisa, sorella di Giacomo

References

Bibliography
 Moliterno, Gino. Historical Dictionary of Italian Cinema. Scarecrow Press, 2008.

External links

1943 films
Films directed by Alberto Lattuada
1943 drama films
Italian drama films
Films based on Italian novels
Italian black-and-white films
1940s Italian-language films
1943 directorial debut films
1940s Italian films